VASP Flight 168, a Boeing 727-212, serial number 21347, registered PP-SRK, was a scheduled passenger flight from São Paulo to Fortaleza, Brazil which, on June 8, 1982, crashed into terrain while descending into Fortaleza, killing all 137 people on board.

The crash of Flight 168 remains the third-highest death toll of any aviation accident in Brazil after Gol Transportes Aéreos Flight 1907 and TAM Airlines Flight 3054.

Flight history
Flight 168's first leg was from São Paulo to Rio de Janeiro, which was completed uneventfully. The flight then departed Rio de Janeiro for Fortaleza. The dead included Brazilian industrialist Edson Queiroz.

Investigation
Investigation revealed that the captain, possibly disoriented due to bright lights from the city ahead, continued the descent well below the  clearance limit, despite being warned twice by the altitude alert system, as well as by the co-pilot, of the terrain ahead.

From the final cockpit voice recorder translated transcript:F/O = First Officer
CAPT = Captain

F/O: 	Can you see there are some hills in front?
CAPT: 	What? There's what?
F/O: 	Some hills, isn't there?
[Sound of altitude alert]
[Sound of impact]

See also

List of accidents and incidents involving commercial aircraft
Sensory illusions in aviation

References

External links
Final Report  - CENIPA
Boeing 727-212A PP-SRK (in Portuguese) – a detailed analysis and description of the accident

Aviation accidents and incidents in 1982
Airliner accidents and incidents involving controlled flight into terrain
Airliner accidents and incidents caused by pilot error
Aviation accidents and incidents in Brazil
1982 in Brazil
Accidents and incidents involving the Boeing 727
VASP accidents and incidents
June 1982 events in South America